State Highway 99 (SH 99), also known as the Grand Parkway, is a ring road in the U.S. state of Texas. Its first section opened on August 31, 1994. When the route is completed, it will be the longest beltway in the U.S., the world's seventh-longest ring road, and the third (outer) loop of the Houston–The Woodlands–Sugar Land metropolitan area, with Interstate 610 being the first (inner) loop and Beltway 8 (Sam Houston Tollway) being the second (middle) loop. The proposed  loop has been divided into 11 separate segments for construction and funding purposes.  In May 2019, the Texas Department of Transportation gave the Grand Parkway a secondary designation as the Mayor Bob Lanier Memorial Parkway, honoring Bob Lanier, who served as the mayor of Houston from 1992 to 1998 and who had spearheaded the creation of the Grand Parkway.

History

A previous route designated SH 99 was established on August 18, 1924, from San Angelo to Fort Stockton. On June 25, 1929, SH 99 was extended to Alpine. On March 2, 1932, a spur to Sherwood with the designation SH 99A was added, but was maintained by the county. On July 23, 1934, this route was transferred to SH 10, and SH 99A was cancelled by then. The route is part of present-day U.S. Route 67 (US 67).

On October 29, 1960, a new route was designated for SH 99, from Denton to the Oklahoma state line as a renumbering of SH 10, to match OK 99 at the border. On April 29, 1968, this route became part of US 377.

On October 25, 1984, SH 99 was designated along a very similar route to its current one, but ending at SH 146 (then Loop 201) and Spur 330. On March 28, 2002, SH 99 was rerouted further east along a new route south to Spur 55 and along Spur 55 to Business SH 146. Spur 55 was cancelled, effective upon the completion of that section of SH 99 in 2008.

Route description
The Grand Parkway project is divided into several segments for construction and administrative purposes. The section from Interstate 69 (I-69) in Sugar Land north to the Westpark Tollway is the southern portion of Segment D and is maintained by the Fort Bend County Toll Road Authority. The remainder of Segment D, which runs from the Westpark Tollway north to I-10, along with the other completed segments , are maintained by the Texas Department of Transportation.

Tolls may be paid using one of the Texas toll tag transponders (TxTag, EZ TAG, and TollTag), the Kansas Turnpike Authority's K-TAG, or the Oklahoma Turnpike Authority's Pikepass. No cash payments are accepted. , a pay-by-mail option is available on segments maintained by TxDOT.

Segment A
Segment A would extend from SH 146 near San Leon to I-45 in League City. As of November 2022,  it is not considered a viable project.

Segment B
Segment B will extend from I-45 in League City to SH 288 near Rosharon. , construction has not yet been scheduled.

Segment C
Segment C will extend from SH 288 near Rosharon to I-69/US 59 in Sugar Land. , its estimated completion date is to be determined.

Segment D
Segment D, the first section opened, runs from just north of I-10/US 90, west of Houston, south to I-69/US 59 in Sugar Land, where it terminates and intersects with FM 2759. The portion of this segment south of the interchange with the Westpark Tollway is now a four-lane divided highway feeder road, with mainlanes crossing over the Westpark Tollway.

The 18-month-long construction of two ramps connecting westbound I-10/US 90 to southbound SH 99 and northbound SH 99 to eastbound I-10/US 90 was completed in 2011. The occasional traffic jams at this intersection prompted the sped-up construction of the ramps before the through lanes of SH 99 were built through the I-10/US 90 interchange. Two more ramps connecting southbound SH 99 to eastbound I-10/US 90 and westbound I-10/US 90 to northbound SH 99 opened as part of the construction of Segment E in December 2013. A final ramp connecting northbound SH 99 to westbound I-10/US 90 has been completed and is operational.

Between the Westpark Tollway and I-69/US 59, Fort Bend County has constructed toll overpasses at nine locations along SH 99. Overpasses between I-69/US 59 and US 90 Alternate opened on February 27, 2014, Airport Boulevard and Harlem Road on March 18, 2014, and Mason Road and Bellfort Street on March 30, 2014. The remainder of the tolled overpasses to I-10/US 90 opened in late April 2014. Motorists in 2-axle vehicles may pay between $0.46 and $0.69 to use each overpass, or they may bypass the toll by using the current roadway through the signalized intersections.

A TxDOT study is currently underway for Segment D. The study includes looking at ways to reduce traffic in the original segment of the non-tolled portion of the freeway; this includes the possibility of adding continuous frontage roads. This segment has been open since 1994 and population, and thus traffic, in the surrounding area has increased greatly since. There is no timetable on when or if any new projects will come out of this study.

Segment E
Segment E connects I-10/US 90 Katy Freeway in the south near Katy to US 290/SH 6 near Cypress. Construction began in summer 2011, and Segment E opened as scheduled in December 2013.

On June 3, 2008, the Harris County Commissioners Court voted to fast-track the construction of Segment E, with construction to begin in 2009. Despite the addition of $150 million in stimulus funding, the project stalled. As with many stimulus-funded projects, the construction of Segment E turned out not to be "shovel ready" enough, and the funds were sent back to TxDOT for use elsewhere. In 2011, the Wetlands permit from the Army Corps of Engineers was acquired. In addition, Harris County relinquished its rights to TxDOT so that the latter could construct a public–private cooperative toll road. At its meeting on April 28, 2011, TxDOT allocated $350 million, and the construction permits were let in July 2011. On July 28, 2011, TxDOT reported that three out of four contracts for Segment E were awarded and that construction would start by early September 2011.

The multi-year reconstruction of I-10/US 90 was completed in 2008, while US 290/SH 6 reconstruction was not scheduled to begin until 2011. The  section of I-10/US 90 from Katy to just inside the I-610 loop was expanded to handle the rapidly-growing western suburbs with additional mainlanes and two high-occupancy toll lanes.

Segment F-1
Segment F-1 connects US 290/SH 6 near Cypress to SH 249 near Tomball. Construction began in June 2013 and was completed and opened to traffic on February 5, 2016. In early 2020, construction commenced on four direct connectors: two from northbound Tomball Tollway to east and westbound Grand Parkway, and two connecting to southbound Tomball Tollway from east and westbound Grand Parkway. The project is scheduled for completion in 2022.

Segment F-2
Segment F-2 connects SH 249 near Tomball with I-45 near Spring. Construction began on Segment F-2 in June 2013.  A one-mile section of frontage road lanes between I-45 and Holzwarth Road (near the ExxonMobil Campus in Spring) was completed and opened to traffic in April 2015.  The remainder of Segment F-2 opened on February 5, 2016.

Segment G
Segment G connects I-45 near Spring with I-69/US 59 in New Caney. Construction began in June 2013 and was completed and opened to traffic on March 29, 2016. An interchange with the Hardy Toll Road was completed on July 18, 2016.

Segments H and I-1
Segments H and I-1 extend from I-69/US 59 north of Houston to I-10. Texas Transportation Commission members met in Pasadena in late June 2015, and one item on their agenda is soliciting interested builders to develop, build and maintain the next  Grand Parkway segment from I-69/US 59 north of Houston to I-10 east of the city. The project, which began construction in the summer of 2017, was expected to cost $1.2 billion. Due to Hurricane Harvey, the completion date was delayed from 2019 to May 2022, when it opened.

Segment I-2
Segment I-2, which opened on March 25, 2008, after five years of construction, runs from I-10 east of Houston south to Business SH 146 in Baytown. (The former Spur 55, which ran from FM 1405 to Business 146, was renumbered SH 99 and connects with the newly constructed portion of Segment I-2 at FM 1405.) TxDOT began collecting tolls on this segment on November 1, 2011.

Opposition and support

Residents who live along the Grand Parkway in Harris and Fort Bend counties, namely in the Cinco Ranch and Falcon Point areas within Segment D, have noticed increased noise due to expansion of the highway, which includes construction of new overpasses as well as increased growth in the surrounding area. Sound barriers have not been constructed based on an environmental study that is over 30 years old. Resident petitions and protests for a new sound barrier study have not been addressed, and TxDOT claims that the section of the route in the area "does not qualify for that." Further expansion in this area is planned to start in 2010 with two tollway lanes added in each direction.

Some groups of residents oppose the idea of the Grand Parkway going through their neighborhoods. The group United to Save Our Spring tried to stop the Grand Parkway from going through a neighborhood off FM 2920. Residents in other unincorporated areas such as The Woodlands have not shown the same opposition, instead supporting the construction of the Grand Parkway, namely Segments E, F-1, F-2, and G, as the route would give residents living in the outer suburbs a toll road option for long-distance travel, as opposed to having to drive through the city of Houston or using the Sam Houston Tollway to bypass the city.

Some residents in Brazoria County, along Segment B, have voiced opposition to several of the proposed alignments. However, TxDOT has recently proposed a fifth alternative alignment to the north of Alvin. This alternative is acceptable to the opposition group Citizens Against the Grand Parkway and is likely to encounter much less opposition from the community.

The controversial Segment A, which would stretch from SH 146 to I-45 southeast of Houston through a very developed area, has not been fully designed yet. SH 146 is a possible routing of the highway in Segment A, but TxDOT has released plans for the highway to intersect I-45 from the west at its intersection with FM 646. If the highway were to continue south on SH 146 to its intersection with FM 646 (supposing that it is built along the route of FM 646), it would eventually have to pass through the town of Kemah, which could not support a large highway unless many businesses were destroyed.

Exit list

See also

Notes

References

External links

 Grand Parkway Transportation Corporation
 TxTAG – Houston Area Tolls
 Fort Bend Grand Parkway Toll Road Authority

State highways in Texas
Toll roads in Texas
Roads in Houston
Texas State Highway 99
Texas State Highway 99
Texas State Highway 99
Texas State Highway 99
Texas State Highway 99
Texas State Highway 99
Texas State Highway 99
Texas State Highway 99
Parkways in the United States